IPM Zmaj (full legal name: Industrija Poljoprivrednih Mašina Zmaj) is a Serbian company that produces small agricultural machines.

The company emerged in October 1946 from the nationalized aircraft producer Zmaj. It was privatized in 2006.

Once known worldwide for its combine harvesters, in 2017 the company employed around 40 people and owned more than 200 hectares of land.

References 

Agricultural machinery manufacturers of Serbia
Companies of Serbia